Addison Creek is a  stream in the northeastern portion of the U.S. state of Illinois. It is a tributary of Salt Creek. Addison Creek originates in Bensenville and runs south and east through Northlake, Stone Park, Maywood, Bellwood, and Westchester. Water from the creek flows via Salt Creek, the Des Plaines River, and the Illinois River to the Mississippi River and ultimately the Gulf of Mexico.

References

Bodies of water of DuPage County, Illinois
Rivers of Cook County, Illinois
Rivers of Illinois